Destiny O Ugo is a former Botswanan footballer.

Career statistics

Club

Notes

References

External links
 Yau Yee Football League profile

Living people
Date of birth unknown
Botswana footballers
Association football midfielders
Hong Kong Premier League players
Hong Kong FC players
Botswana expatriate footballers
Expatriate footballers in Hong Kong
Year of birth missing (living people)